Ridin' on the Blinds was the second and final album by the folk-rock trio of Rick Danko, Jonas Fjeld and Eric Andersen. Released in 1994, it was different from its predecessor in that its focus was rootsier, influenced more by the folk leanings of the group than their rock leanings.

Among the tracks are tributes to Paul Butterfield ("Every Man Is His Own Hero") and Richard Manuel ("All Creation"), definitive readings of The Band's "Twilight" and Tom Paxton's "Bottle of Wine" and a duet between Andersen and guest vocalist Kirsten Berg on Richard Thompson's "Dimming of the Day".

Work was planned for a third trio album three years later when Rick Danko's arrest for drug possession put these plans on hold temporarily. Two years later, with Rick Danko's December 1999 death, these plans were put permanently to rest. The remaining duo toured with Danko's bandmate Garth Hudson in 2001 behind the album One More Shot, though no further albums have come.

Track listing
"Ridin' on the Blinds" (Eric Andersen, Rick Danko, Jonas Fjeld) – 3:49
"Twilight" (Robbie Robertson)§ – 2:59
"Dimming of the Day" (Richard Thompson) – 3:11
"Ragtop" (Andersen, Danko, Fjeld) – 3:30
"Come Runnin' Like A Friend" (Andersen) – 6:11
"Women 'Cross The River" (David Olney) – 3:28
"Lie With Me" (Andersen) – 4:14
"All Creation" (Andersen, Danko) – 3:34
"Outside Track" (Henry Lawson, G. W. Hallow) – 4:07
"Every Man Is His Own Hero" (Andersen, Danko, Fjeld) – 4:48
"Baby, I'm Lonesome" (Andersen) – 3;41
"Your Eyes" (Fjeld, Jim Sherraden) – 4:38
"Bottle of Wine" (Tom Paxton) – 2:44
"Keep This Love Alive" (Andersen, Danko) – 4:29

§ Danko claimed co-authorship of "Twilight" off and on from 1976 until his death in 1999.

Personnel
 Rick Danko – lead and backing vocals, bass, guitars
 Jonas Fjeld – lead and backing vocals, guitars
 Eric Andersen – lead and backing vocals, guitars, B-3 organ, keyboards
with 
 Rune Arnesen – drums, percussion
 Kirsten B. Berg – lead and backing vocals
 Halvard T. Bjørgum – hardanger fiddle
 Bent Bredesen – guitar
 Jørun Bøgeberg – acoustic bass, mandolin
 Garth Hudson – keyboards, accordion
 Tone Hulbækmo – medieval harp, footpump organ
 Hans F. Jakobsen – medieval bagpipes, flutes, Finnish lap harp
 Ed Kaercher – guitar, backing vocals
 Frode Larsen – harmonica
 Lillebjørn Nilsen – banjo, dulcimer, Jews harp
 Oslo Gospel Choir
 Knut Reiersrud – guitars, harmonica, Turkish saz, langeleik, mandolin
 Kristin Skaare – accordion, keyboards, harmonium
 Georgia Slim – piano
 Bugge Wesseltoft – keyboards
 Marianne Berg, Audun Erlien, Ingar Helgesen, Mariann Lisand, Per Ø. Sørensen and Liz T. Vespestad – backing vocals

1994 albums
Rick Danko albums
Eric Andersen albums
Jonas Fjeld albums